The Team large hill event of the FIS Nordic World Ski Championships 2015 was held on 28 February 2015.

Results
The first round was started at 17:15 and the second round at 18:35.

References

Team large hill